Möll Spur is a jagged rock spur which juts southward from the Jaron Cliffs on the southern slope of Mount Takahe in Marie Byrd Land, Antarctica. It was mapped by United States Geological Survey from surveys and U.S. Navy tricamera aerial photos, 1959–66, and was named by the Advisory Committee on Antarctic Names for Markus Möll of the University of Bern, Switzerland, a United States Antarctic Research Program glaciologist at Byrd Station in 1969–70.

References

Ridges of Marie Byrd Land